The Roman Catholic Archdiocese of Kananga is the Metropolitan See for the Ecclesiastical province of Kananga in the Democratic Republic of the Congo.

Special churches 
The episcopal cathedral is the Cathédrale Saint Joseph Mikalayi in Kazumba.
 
There is also a Pro-Cathedral, the Pro-cathédrale Saint Clément in Kananga.

History 
 Established on 26 July 1901 as Mission sui juris of Upper Kassai (Kasaï Supérieur), on territory split off from the then Apostolic Vicariate of Belgian Congo (Congo Belge)
 March 18, 1904 promoted as the Apostolic Prefecture of Upper Kassai
 June 13, 1917, again promoted as the Apostolic Vicariate of Upper Kasai, hence entitled to a titular bishop
 Lost territory repeatedly, to establish : the Apostolic Prefecture of Lulua Katanga on 18 July 1922, the Apostolic Prefecture of Tshumbe on 1936.05.18, the Apostolic Prefecture of Ipamu on 1937.04.13 and the Apostolic Prefecture of Ipamu on 1939.04.25.
 March 10, 1949: Renamed as the Apostolic Vicariate of Luluabourg
 Lost territories on 23 March 1953 to establish both Apostolic Vicariate of Kabinda and Apostolic Prefecture of Mweka
 On 1959.04.25, lost territory to establish the Apostolic Vicariate of Luebo 
 November 10, 1959: Promoted as Metropolitan Archdiocese of Luluabourg
 On 1963.11.22, lost territory to establish the then Apostolic Administration of Mbuji-Mayi
 Lost territories on 1967.09.26, to Diocese of Luebo (as transfer), and establish the Diocese of Luiza
 June 14, 1972: Renamed as Metropolitan Archdiocese of Kananga

Leadership
 Apostolic Prefects of Upper Kasai
 Fr. Emeri Cambier, Sceutists (C.I.C.M.) (1904 – 1918)
 Fr. Egide de Boeck, C.I.C.M. (1913 – 1916), later Apostolic Vicar of Nieuw-Antwerpen (Congo-Kinshasa) (1921.01.04 – 1936.01.27), Titular Bishop of Azotus (1921.03.10 – 1944.12.20), Apostolic Vicar of Lisala (Congo-Kinshasa) (1936.01.27 – 1944.12.20)
 Fr. Ernest Handekijn (1916 – 1917.06.13)

 Apostolic Vicars of Upper Kasai
 Bishop Auguste Declercq, C.I.C.M. (1918.08.24 – 1938.10.29), Titular Bishop of Thignica (1918.08.24 – death 1939.11.23)
 Bishop Louis-Georges-Firmin Demol, C.I.C.M. (1938.10.29 – 1948.04.22), Titular Bishop of Vescera (1936.01.27 – 1969.07.02); succeeding as previous Coadjutor Vicar Apostolic of Kasaï Supérieur (1936.01.23 – 1938.10.29)

 Apostolic Vicar of Luluabourg
 Bishop Bernard Mels, C.I.C.M. (1949.03.10 – 1959.11.10 see below), Titular Bishop of Belali (1949.03.10 – 1959.11.10); also Apostolic Administrator of Mweka (Congo-Kinshasa) (1953 – 1957)

 Metropolitan Archbishops of Luluabourg
 Archbishop Bernard Mels, C.I.C.M. (see above 1959.11.10 – 1967.09.26); later Archbishop-Bishop of Lwiza (Congo-Kinshasa) (1967.09.26 – 1970.10.03), finally Titular Archbishop of Pulcheriopolis (1970.10.03 – 1986.05.17)
 Archbishop Martin-Léonard Bakole wa Ilunga (1967.09.26 – 1972.06.14 see below), previously Titular Bishop of Sullectum (1966.06.21 – 1967.09.26) & Auxiliary Bishop of Luluabourg (1966.06.21 – 1967.09.26)

 Metropolitan Archbishops of Kananga
 Archbishop Martin-Léonard Bakole wa Ilunga (see above 1972.06.14 – 1997.03.03)
 Archbishop Godefroid Mukeng’a Kalond, C.I.C.M. (1997.03.03 – 2006.05.03), previously Bishop of Lwiza (1971.08.30 – 1997.03.03)
 Archbishop Marcel Madila Basanguka (since 2006.12.09 - ...), previously Titular Bishop of Gigthi (2004.02.27 – 2006.12.09) & Auxiliary Bishop of Kananga (2004.02.27 – 2006.12.09)

Coadjutor vicar apostolic
Louis-Georges-Firmin Demol, C.I.C.M. (1936-1938)

Auxiliary bishops
Martin-Léonard Bakole wa Ilunga (1966-1967), appointed Archbishop here
Marcel Madila Basanguka (2004-2006), appointed Archbishop here

Other priests of this diocese who became bishop
Pierre-Célestin Tshitoko Mamba, appointed Bishop of Luebo in 2006

Province 
Its ecclesiastical province comprises the Metropolitan's own Archdiocese and the following Suffragan dioceses, generally daughters (see above) :
 Roman Catholic Diocese of Kabinda
 Roman Catholic Diocese of Kole
 Roman Catholic Diocese of Luebo
 Roman Catholic Diocese of Luiza
 Roman Catholic Diocese of Mbujimayi
 Roman Catholic Diocese of Mweka
 Roman Catholic Diocese of Tshilomba
 Roman Catholic Diocese of Tshumbe

See also 
 Roman Catholicism in the Democratic Republic of the Congo

Source and external links 

 Archdiocese of Kananga website (in French)
 GCatholic.org, with incumbent biography links

Kananga
Roman Catholic dioceses in the Democratic Republic of the Congo
Christian organizations established in 1904
Roman Catholic dioceses and prelatures established in the 20th century
A